VPP may refer to:

Organisations
Vanuatu Presidential Party, a political party in Vanuatu
Vermont Progressive Party, third party based in Vermont, United States
Vietnam Populist Party, a Vietnamese illegal party
Veterans and People's Party, a minor political party in the United Kingdom
Volunteer Political Party, a short-lived loyalist political party in Northern Ireland
Venture Philanthropy Partners, a philanthropic organization in the Washington D.C. metro area

Technology and engineering
 Vaginal photoplethysmograph, arousal measuring device
 Variable-pitch propeller (disambiguation), a type of propeller used in aircraft and ships
 Velocity prediction program, velocity prediction program
 Vector Packet Processing technology, software that provides network switch/router functionality
 Virtual Party Protocol, an SMC protocol
 Virtual Power Plant, a cluster of distributed energy generation installations controlled by a central entity
 Voltage peak-to-peak (Vpp), in electronics; for example see Line level

Other uses
Verbal Plenary Preservation
 Virtual Presence Post, an e-consulate run by the US Department of State
 Volumetric Production Payment, a form of financing
 Voluntary Protection Program, a safety management program administered by OSHA in the US